Order of Honor of Republika Srpska is an Order of the Republic of Srpska. It was established in 1993 by the Constitution of Republika Srpska and 'Law on orders and awards' valid since 28 April 1993.

The Order of Honor has two classes. It is awarded to institutions, organizations and individuals who stand out in the affirmation of human rights, tolerance among peoples and nations, the rule of law and freedoms, as well as those individuals and organizations whose work and results contribute to strengthening  the reputation of Republika Srpska.

Notable recipients

With golden rays
 2016 -  Haim Bibas, the mayor of Modi'in-Maccabim-Re'ut, for friendly relations between Republika Srpska and Israel
 2013 -  Srđan Aleksić
 2012 -  Franjo Komarica, the Bishop of Banja Luka

With silver rays
 2018 -  Miroslav Lazanski, journalist and military analyst

See also 
 Orders, decorations and medals of Republika Srpska

References

Orders, decorations, and medals of Republic of Srpska
Awards established in 1993